The commissioner of the Ontario Provincial Police is the professional head of the Ontario Provincial Police (OPP). The commissioner is responsible for the management and administration of the OPP operations.

Thomas Carrique has been the 15th commissioner of the OPP since June 6, 2019.

History

Pre-OPP 
In May 1875, the first head of a provincial police force was John Wilson Murray, who was a provincial constable appointed to the position of "Detective for the Province of Ontario". Murray was joined by two detectives under his command, Joseph Edwin Rogers in 1884 and William D. Greer in 1887. By 1887 Murray became Chief Inspector with Rogers and Greer becoming Inspectors.

Creation of OPP 
Chief Detective Murray died in 1906, and in 1909, the Ontario Provincial Police Force was formally created. It consisted of 45 constables under the direction of Superintendent Joseph E. Rogers, who began as a detective under Murray in 1884.

In 1921, the force was reorganized as the OPP with the passage of the Provincial Police Force Act. Major General Harry Macintyre Cawthra-Elliot was appointed to the newly created position of Commissioner. In 1922, Joseph E. Rogers was dismissed from the force by Victor Williams, thus ending his tenure as the head of the OPP.

Since 1939, most OPP Commissioners have been police officers (Eric Silk was a civilian) and some (12 up to 2018) promoted from current or former members of the OPP.

List of OPP Commissioners

References